Bernard John Hunt, MBE (2 February 1930 – 21 June 2013) was an English professional golfer.

Hunt was born in Atherstone, Warwickshire. He turned professional in 1946 and was a leading player on the European circuit in the 1950s and 1960s. He topped the Order of Merit, which was then points-based, in 1958, 1960 and 1965. The best season of his regular career in prize money terms was 1963, when he won £7,209. He was past his peak by the time the formal European Tour was introduced in 1972, but finished in the top twenty on the money list in 1973. He played on the European Seniors Tour in for its first seven seasons (1992–1998) but his opportunity to make an impact at this level was limited as he was sixty-two by the time the tour was founded. His best season was 1994, when he came fifteenth on the Order of Merit and earned £15,361.

Between 1953 and 1969 Hunt represented Great Britain in the Ryder Cup eight times out of nine. His overall win–loss–half record was 6–16–6, but his record in singles was much better at 4–3–3. In 1963 his younger brother Geoff was also in the team. He was the non-playing captain of the Great Britain & Ireland teams of 1973 and 1975, both of which were defeated by the United States.

One of the courses at Foxhills Golf Club located in Ottershaw, Surrey, is named after Hunt, where he served as head professional for 25 years in the 1980s and 1990s.

Hunt died in June 2013 at the age of 83.

Professional wins (31)
This list may be incomplete
1952 Coombe Hill Assistants' Tournament
1953 Gor-Ray Cup, Spalding Tournament, Coombe Hill Assistants' Tournament, Goodwin (Sheffield) Foursomes Tournament (with Jack Hargreaves), Gleneagles-Saxone Foursomes Tournament (with Stewart Ross)
1954 Goodwin (Sheffield) Foursomes Tournament (with Sid Collins Jr.)
1956 Egyptian Open
1957 Spalding Tournament, Belgian Open
1958 Irish Hospitals Tournament (tied with Frank Jowle), Bowmaker Tournament (tied with Peter Mills), Professional Short Course Championship
1959 Southern Professional Championship
1960 Pickering Tournament (with Geoffrey Hunt), Southern Professional Championship
1961 German Open, Daks Tournament, Martini International, Woodlawn Tournament
1962 Brazil Open, Smart Weston Southern Professional Championship
1963 British Masters, Smart Weston Tournament, Swallow-Penfold Tournament, Gevacolor Tournament, Carroll Sweet Afton Tournament
1964 Rediffusion Tournament
1965 Gallaher Ulster Open, British Masters
1966 Piccadilly Tournament
1967 French Open, Gallaher Ulster Open
1968 Basildon Tournament
1969 Algarve Open, Italian BP Open
1970 Agfa-Gevaert Tournament, Sumrie Better-Ball (with Neil Coles), Penfold Tournament
1971 W.D. & H.O. Wills Tournament
1973 Grand Bahama Open, Sumrie Better-Ball (with Neil Coles)

Results in major championships

Note: Hunt only played in the Masters Tournament and The Open Championship.

CUT = missed the half-way cut (3rd round cut in 1970 and 1972 Open Championships)
"T" indicates a tie for a place

Summary

Most consecutive cuts made – 6 (1955 Open Championship – 1960 Open Championship)
Longest streak of top-10s – 1 (four times)

Team appearances
Ryder Cup (representing Great Britain): 1953, 1957 (winners), 1959, 1961, 1963, 1965, 1967, 1969
World Cup (representing England): 1958, 1959, 1960, 1962, 1963, 1964, 1968
Joy Cup (representing the British Isles): 1958 (winners)
Amateurs–Professionals Match (representing the Professionals): 1957 (winners), 1958, 1959 (winners), 1960 (winners)
Double Diamond International (representing England): 1971 (winners, captain), 1972 (winners, captain), 1973 (captain)

References

External links

English male golfers
European Tour golfers
European Senior Tour golfers
Ryder Cup competitors for Europe
Members of the Order of the British Empire
People from Atherstone
Sportspeople from Woking
People from Ottershaw
1930 births
2013 deaths